Graffenrieda is a genus of flowering plants in the family Melastomataceae. There are about 44 species. Most occur in South America. A few are distributed in Mexico, Central America and the Caribbean.

Species include:
Graffenrieda bella
Graffenrieda caudata
Graffenrieda glandulosa
Graffenrieda grandifolia
Graffenrieda harlingii
Graffenrieda jefensis
Graffenrieda maklenkensis
Graffenrieda penneysii
Graffenrieda phoenica
Graffenrieda robusta
Graffenrieda trichanthera

References

 
Melastomataceae genera